The  is the prefectural parliament of Kagoshima Prefecture.

Members
As of 31 October 2019
Source:

References

External links
Official website (Japanese)

Prefectural assemblies of Japan
Politics of Kagoshima Prefecture